The 1939 Tschammerpokal was the 5th season of the annual German football cup competition. In the final which was held on 28 April 1940 in the Olympiastadion 1. FC Nürnberg defeated Waldhof Mannheim 2–0, thereby becoming the first club to win the cup twice.

Matches

First round

Replay

Second round

Round of 16

Quarter-finals

Semi-finals

Replays

* After the second replay a drawing decided that Mannheim would advance to the final.

Final

References

External links
 Official site of the DFB 
 Kicker.de 
 Tschammerpokal at Fussballberichte.de 

1939
1939 in German football cups